Rappahannock County High School is a public high school in Washington, Virginia, and serves grades 8-12.  It is a part of Rappahannock County Public Schools. RCHS is the only public high school in Rappahannock County, Virginia, and serves the local communities of Amissville, Chester Gap, Flint Hill, Sperryville, Castleton, Laurel Mills, and the town of Washington, among others.

Academics 
Rappahannock County High School offers a challenging curriculum featuring several classes with Advanced Placement or Dual Enrollment designations.  RCHS, a fully accredited school, operates with a modified block schedule with year-long options for English and Math.  Educational disciplines that are offered at RCHS include: science, social studies, math, English, band, physical education, art, and world language.  RCHS also offers vocational education classes such as culinary, technology education, business, building management, and welding.

Athletics 
Rappahannock County High School participates in the Bull Run District 1B under the Virginia High School League (VHSL). RCHS offers varsity and junior varsity sports in the following arenas: football, golf, soccer, basketball, volleyball, cross country, wrestling, track and field, baseball, softball, esports, scholastic bowl, and sideline cheerleading.

Football 
As of 2022, the RCHS football program competes in the Virginia Independent Schools Football League where teams field 8-player teams, rather than the traditional 11-player formations on both offense and defense. The RCHS Panthers finished the 2022 season with an overall record of 6-5.

Girls' Basketball 
On March 9, 2023 the RCHS Girls' Varsity Basketball team earned their first state title by defeating the Eastside Spartans 70-65 at the Class 1 State Championship game held at the Siegel Center at Virginia Commonwealth University.

Commit To Be Fit 
Commit to Be Fit is a school sponsored, grant funded program in Rappahannock County, Virginia.  Through the generosity of the PATH Foundation, Commit to Be Fit was created to help promote healthier lifestyles for students, staff, and county residents/employees. All classes, workshops, and events are free of charge and held at the Rappahannock County Public Schools.

Student Support Services 
RCHS features a designated school social worker. School social workers are trained mental health professionals with a degree in social work who provide services related to students’ and/or families’ social and emotional well-being, as well as structured support for adjustment to school and society. School Social Workers are a link between the home, school and community that can provide direct as well as indirect services to students, families, and school personnel to promote and support students’ academic and social success.

Technology 
The mission of the RCHS Technology Department is to prepare students for the technological opportunities of the 21st century by working with staff and students to provide the necessary training to prepare our students for success after graduation.  Currently, RCHS students enjoy a 1:1 student-to-Chromebook ratio.

Hotspot Hub Locations 
Thanks to the support of community businesses, churches, and organizations, RCHS has multiple locations where students and families can access high-speed internet.

Notable alumni 

 Emily Jane Hilscher, RCHS Class of 2006.
Johanna Day, RCHS Class of 1981. Tony Award-nominated actress.

References

Public high schools in Virginia
Schools in Rappahannock County, Virginia